The Type 092 (Chinese designation: 09-II; NATO reporting name: Xia class) submarine was the first nuclear-powered ballistic missile submarine (SSBN) deployed by the People's Liberation Army Navy Submarine Force.

Background
The Type 092 submarine was completed in 1981. She then spent six years being fitted out and conducting tests with its twelve JL-1 missiles, becoming active in 1987. Later, the submarine went through numerous upgrades in incremental step, including using Type H/SQ2-262B sonar manufactured by No. 613 Factory replacing the original Type 604 sonar on board. It reportedly suffered from limited missile range and high sound emissions.

She was designed by Peng Shilu (彭士禄) and Huang Xuhua, and derived from the Type 091 submarines, with an extended hull to accommodate twelve missile tubes.

The 092 has undergone numerous refits, currently featuring a new black paint, possible quieting technologies, French-designed sonar, and the improved longer ranged JL-1A SLBM. Homeported in Jianggezhuang near Qingdao, it is reported that the 092 has never conducted strategic patrols outside Chinese regional waters. The sub undertook a single patrol and then never sailed again, staying pierside for so long there were rumors it had been lost in an accident in 1985. The boat was more of a test bed, allowing China to test new underwater technologies as it gradually placed more emphasis on naval forces in general.

The 092 is aging however and a new nuclear-powered ballistic missile submarine, the Type 094, has been developed and deployed by the People's Liberation Army Navy. The U.S. Defense Intelligence Agency lists the 092 as being "not operational." While its capability is still being questioned, Xia made its worldwide debut on 23 April 2009 celebrating the 60th anniversary of the PLA Navy's founding.

The submarine became operational in 1983, but faced enduring problems with reliability and radiation leakage from its onboard nuclear reactor. The submarine is also allegedly the noisiest of all U.S., Russian and Chinese ballistic missile submarines, making it very easy to detect and track.

Rumour of a lost second boat
A second boat is reported to have been completed in 1982, however this has not been substantiated. There is little evidence that a second ship was ever built. Published reports that mention the boat also mention unsubstantiated reports that a second Type 092 was lost in an accident in 1985.

Boats

See also
 People's Liberation Army Navy Submarine Force
 List of submarine classes in service
 Submarine-launched ballistic missile

References

External links
 Federation of American Scientists: Type 92 Xia

 
Submarine classes
Ballistic missile submarines
1981 ships
Nuclear-powered submarines
Nuclear submarines of the Chinese Navy